The 2021–22 season was the 98th season in the existence of AEK Athens F.C. and the 61st competitive season and seventh consecutive in the top flight of Greek football. They competed in the Super League, the Greek Cup and the Europa Conference League. The season began on 20 July 2021 and finished on 17 May 2022.

Players

Squad information
NOTE: The players are the ones that have been announced by the AEK Athens' press release. No edits should be made unless a player arrival or exit is announced. Updated 17 May 2022, 23:59 UTC+3.

Transfers

In

Summer

Winter

Out

Summer

Winter

Notes

 a.  plus €500,000 if Crotone gets promoted to Serie A

Loan in

Summer

Winter

Loan out

Summer

Winter

Renewals

Overall transfer activity

Expenditure
Summer:  €4,712,500

Winter:  €0

Total:  €4,712,500

Income
Summer:  €2,000,000

Winter:  €0

Total:  €2,000,000

Net Totals
Summer:  €2,712,500

Winter:  €0

Total:  €2,712,500

Pre-season and friendlies

Super League Greece

Regular season

League table

Results by Matchday

Fixtures

Play-off round

Table

Results by Matchday

Fixtures

Greek Cup

AEK entered the Greek Cup at the Round of 16.

Round of 16

Quarter-finals

UEFA Europa Conference League

Second qualifying round

Statistics

Squad statistics

! colspan="13" style="background:#FFDE00; text-align:center" | Goalkeepers
|-

! colspan="13" style="background:#FFDE00; color:black; text-align:center;"| Defenders
|-

! colspan="13" style="background:#FFDE00; color:black; text-align:center;"| Midfielders
|-

! colspan="13" style="background:#FFDE00; color:black; text-align:center;"| Forwards
|-

! colspan="13" style="background:#FFDE00; color:black; text-align:center;"| Left during Summer Transfer Window
|-

! colspan="13" style="background:#FFDE00; color:black; text-align:center;"| Left during Winter Transfer Window
|-

! colspan="13" style="background:#FFDE00; color:black; text-align:center;"| From AEK Athens B
|-

|}

Disciplinary record

|-
! colspan="20" style="background:#FFDE00; text-align:center" | Goalkeepers

|-
! colspan="20" style="background:#FFDE00; color:black; text-align:center;"| Defenders

|-
! colspan="20" style="background:#FFDE00; color:black; text-align:center;"| Midfielders

|-
! colspan="20" style="background:#FFDE00; color:black; text-align:center;"| Forwards

|-
! colspan="20" style="background:#FFDE00; color:black; text-align:center;"| Left during Summer Transfer window

|-
! colspan="20" style="background:#FFDE00; color:black; text-align:center;"| Left during Winter Transfer window

|-
! colspan="20" style="background:#FFDE00; color:black; text-align:center;"| From AEK Athens B

|}

Starting 11

References

External links
AEK Athens F.C. Official Website

AEK Athens F.C. seasons
AEK Athens
AEK Athens